Salses-le-Château or just Salses is a commune in the Pyrénées-Orientales department in southern France. It is located north of the city of Perpignan.

Geography 
Salses-le-Château is located in the canton of La Vallée de l'Agly and in the arrondissement of Perpignan.

Government and politics

Mayors

Population

Sites of interest 
 Fort de Salses
 The Gate of the Catalan Countries is located in Salses.

See also
Communes of the Pyrénées-Orientales department

References

Communes of Pyrénées-Orientales
Catalan symbols